Anne Murray is a studio album by Canadian country vocalist Anne Murray. It was released by SBK Records on August 6, 1996. It was Murray's last album of all original material. The album peaked at number 10 on the RPM Country Albums chart.

Track listing

Personnel 
 Anne Murray – vocals, backing vocals (5, 11)
 Doug Riley – acoustic piano (1-4, 6), Hammond B3 organ (1-4, 7, 8, 13), Fender Rhodes (7)
 C.J. Vanston – synthesizers (2, 4, 6, 8, 10, 13), Wurlitzer electric piano (5), Hammond organ (5, 9, 11), acoustic piano (8, 11), keyboards (9)
 Mark Goldenberg – electric tremolo guitar (1, 2), acoustic guitar (2, 4, 5, 8), electric baritone guitar (4, 5), electric guitar (5, 6, 9, 11), baritone guitar (8), lap steel guitar (8)
 Bob Mann – acoustic guitar (1, 3, 6, 7, 12, 13), electric guitar (2, 3, 6, 7), electric guitar solo (4), acoustic guitar solo (10)
 Mike "Pepe" Francis – electric guitar (2, 3, 6, 7, 13), acoustic guitar (10)
 Bryan Adams – electric tremolo guitar (3), backing vocals (3)
 Keith Scott – electric guitar solo (3)
 Greg Leisz – dobro (5), pedal steel guitar (6), electric guitar (9), lap steel guitar (11)
 David Resnik – electric guitar (7, 8), Hawaiian slide guitar (13)
 Johnny Lee Schell – electric guitar solo (7)
 Jim Pirie – acoustic guitar (10)
 James "Hutch" Hutchinson – bass (1-11, 13)
 Ricky Fataar – drums (1-4, 6, 7, 8, 13)
 Russ Kunkel – drums (5, 9, 11)
 Luis Conte – percussion (1, 2, 4, 6, 7, 8), bongos (13), shaker (13), surdo (13)
 Brian Leonard – tambourine (1, 3, 13), hand drum (13), tamborim (13)
 Debra Dobkin – percussion (5, 9, 11)
 Glen Clark – harmonica (1), baritone harmonica (10)
 The Texicali Horns (1, 13):
 David Wolford – baritone saxophone
 Joe Sublett – tenor saxophone 
 Darrell Leonard – trumpet 
 Shirley Eikhard – backing vocals (1, 7, 10)
 Don Neilson – backing vocals (1, 7)
 Aaron Neville – vocals (2)
 Valerie Carter – backing vocals (5, 9, 11)
 Willie Greene Jr. – backing vocals (5)
 Dillon O'Brian – backing vocals (5, 9, 11)
 Jann Arden – backing vocals (8)
 Dawn Langstroth – backing vocals (8)

Handclaps on "I Know Too Much"
 Valerie Carter, Debra Dobkin, Mark Goldenberg, Willie Greene Jr., James "Hutch" Hutchinson, Russ Kunkel, Greg Leisz, Cynthia McReynolds, Anne Murray, Dillon O'Brian and C.J. Vanston

Strings on "Highway, Highway"
 Doug Riley – arrangements and conductor 
 Adele Armin, Richard Armin, Mari Barrard, Terrance Helmer, Ronald Mah, Young-Dae Park, Mark Skazanetsky, Vera Tarnowsky, Jim Wallemberg and Laura Wilcox – string players

Production 
 Ed Cherney – producer, recording, mixing 
 Duane Seykora – recording 
 Shawn Edmonson – recording assistant 
 Tom Heron – recording assistant
 Eric Ratz – recording assistant 
 Bob Salcedo – recording assistant
 David Farrell – additional vocal engineer 
 Kevin Doyle – overdub recording
 Olle Romo – overdub engineer
 Tom Banghart – overdub recording assistant 
 Paul Offenbacher – overdub recording assistant 
 Robbes Stieglitz – overdub recording assistant 
 Doug Sax – mastering at The Mastering Lab (Hollywood, California)
 James O'Mara – art direction, photography 
 Helios – layout design, cloud photography
 Bruce Allen – management

Chart performance

References

1996 albums
Anne Murray albums
EMI Records albums
SBK Records albums